Fran Papasedero (March 21, 1969 – June 19, 2003) was an Arena football player and coach. Papasedero coached the Arena Football League's Orlando Predators in the 2002 and 2003 seasons, having been appointed to replace Jay Gruden who wanted to resume his playing career at quarterback for the Predators. He had a 19–11 record and was 3–2 in the playoffs. Following the team's playoff defeat in June 2003, he died in an alcohol-related car accident.

Prior to his coaching career, he played for the Albany Firebirds (1993), Massachusetts Marauders (1994), St. Louis Stampede (1995–1996), and Nashville Kats (1997).

References

External links 
Fran Papasedero (coach) at ArenaFan Online
Fran Papasedero (player) at ArenaFan Online

1969 births
2003 deaths
Springfield Pride football players
American football offensive linemen
American football defensive linemen
Albany Firebirds players
Massachusetts Marauders players
St. Louis Stampede players
Nashville Kats players
Orlando Predators coaches
Road incident deaths in Florida
Alcohol-related deaths in Florida